Zoom Cat Lawyer, also known as I'm Not a Cat, is an Internet meme that refers to a viral video taken from a live stream of a civil forfeiture hearing, and being held on the video conferencing application Zoom in Texas' 394th Judicial District Court. The video features an attorney named Rod Ponton, who is struggling to disable a cat filter that shows a white kitten mask over his face, making it appear as though a cat is speaking.

History
On February 9, 2021, the YouTube account for the 394th District Court of Texas live-streamed and published a clip entitled "Kitten Zoom Filter Mishap." The video features an attorney, Rod Ponton, who accidentally signed in with a white kitten face filter and is attempting to remove it from his Zoom application. In the video, the kitten's eyes appear to dart back and forth when Ponton says, "I don't know how to remove it. I've got my assistant here and she's trying to." Ponton then attempts to move forward, saying, "I'm prepared to go forward with it." Finally, he says, "I'm here live. I'm not a cat." The post later received 3.6 million views on Youtube and over 26.9 million views on Twitter. Ponton told CNN and the Associated Press that he was using his assistant's 10-year-old desktop computer when he logged on to the civil forfeiture hearing. Ponton claimed his secretary or her daughter had last used the image, but Dell Technologies said that it is more likely that the aging desktop's machine needed a software update.

After the clip was posted, Judge Roy Ferguson later shared the clip on Twitter with a tweet being captioned as "IMPORTANT ZOOM TIP: If a child used your computer, before you join a virtual hearing check the Zoom Video Options to be sure filters are off. This kitten just made a formal announcement on a case in the 394th." Reuters reporter Lawrence Hurley later shared the clip on Twitter where he captioned the post, "'I'm here live, I'm not a cat,' says lawyer after Zoom filter mishap. 'I can see that,' responds judge." Canadian poet Margaret Atwood praised and also shared the tweet with a caption "I on the other hand am a cat. I just can't get this human filter off." After the incident, Rod Ponton responded on The New York Times and said that, "If I can make the country chuckle for a moment in these difficult times they're going through, I'm happy to let them do that at my expense." While on Vice, Ponton also said, "Oh, that was just a mistake by my secretary. I was using her computer and for some reason, she had that filter on. I took it off and replaced it with my face. It was a case involving a man trying to exit the United States with contraband and contraband cash. All it was was a mistake. It was taken off and we had the hearing as normal."

Reception
After the clip grew in popularity, several notable media outlets covered the video, including The New York Times, NBC, The Wall Street Journal, USA Today, The Guardian, ABC, The Daily Dot, Vice, CNN, and others. Wonderland described it as one of the best memes 2021 produced. Jochan Embley of Evening Standard described it as one of the "Most hilarious Zoom fails in the year." Natasha Hinde of HuffPost listed it among the "most hilarious Zoom moments of all time", While WPBN-TV has also described the meme as becoming a "bobblehead".

The meme also inspired a prank involving Charles Barkley on Inside the NBA. In a clip where Minnesota representative Tom Emmer appears upside-down in a virtual US Congress Committee Finance meeting a co-attendee references the meme, stating "at least he's not a cat."

The clip also appeared in a Mike's Hard Lemonade commercial.

References

External links
Original video

Internet memes introduced in 2021
Animals on the Internet
Internet culture
2021 in Texas